The Girl Power North America Tour (also known as North American Tour) was the debut headlining concert tour by English singer-songwriter Charli XCX, in support of her second major-label studio album Sucker. The tour also features songs from her first album True Romance. Elliphant and FEMME were featured as opening acts.

Set list
"Sucker"
"Breaking Up"
"I Love It"
"Famous"
"SuperLove"
"Black Roses"
"Lock You Up" (contains elements of "Nuclear Seasons")
"Caught in the Middle"
"Need Ur Luv"
"Stay Away"
"You (Ha Ha Ha)"
"Money (That's What I Want)" (The Flying Lizards cover)
"London Queen"
"Break the Rules"
"Grins"
"Gold Coins"
Encore
"Fancy (GTA Remix)"  
"Boom Clap"

Broadcasts and recordings
On 13 October 2014, the show at Lincoln Hall was streamed live on Yahoo!'s website.

Tour dates

Box office score data

External links

References

2014 concert tours
Charli XCX concert tours